Forced Confessions (Eteraafaat-e Ejbari) is 2012 documentary film by the Persian-Canadian journalist and filmmaker Maziar Bahari about the forced confessions in Iran.

The film premiered at 25th International Documentary Film Festival Amsterdam (IDFA) in November 2012. The short version of the film was aired by BBC Persian TV simultaneously.

Synopsis
In 2009, filmmaker Maziar Bahari, a guest of honor at IDFA 2007, claimed he was forced to make a false confession. He had supposedly been collaborating with the West and was accused of espionage. As a filmmaker and journalist working for Western broadcasting corporations, he was the perfect scapegoat for the regime. Many intellectuals, writers, philosophers and journalists had preceded Bahari since the Iranian Revolution in 1979. The director's own voice-over and interviews with fellow Iranians who have been through the same ordeal guide the viewer through the history of forced confessions in Iran. They are degrading tales of intelligent men who never thought they would have to make false confessions in public, but potentially fatal torture left them with few options. It has now been 30 years since the first false public confession.

References

External links
Forced Confessions on IDFA website

Iranian documentary films
2012 films
2012 documentary films
British documentary films
Documentary films about Iran
Human rights abuses in Iran
Documentary films about human rights
Films directed by Maziar Bahari
2010s British films